Joseph Hubertus Pilates (9 December 1883 – 9 October 1967) was a German-born physical trainer, credited with inventing and promoting the Pilates method of physical fitness.

Biography

Early life 
Joseph Hubertus Pilates was born on 9 December 1883 in Mönchengladbach, Germany. His father, Heinrich Friedrich Pilates, who was born in Greece, was a metal worker and enthusiastic gymnast, and his German-born mother was a housewife.

Pilates was a sickly child. He suffered from asthma, rickets, and rheumatic fever, and he dedicated his entire life to improving his physical strength. He was introduced by his father to gymnastics and body-building, and to martial arts like jiu-jitsu and boxing. By the age of 14, he was fit enough to pose for anatomical charts. Pilates came to believe that the "modern" life-style, bad posture, and inefficient breathing lay at the roots of poor health. He ultimately devised a series of exercises and training techniques, and engineered all the equipment, specifications, and tuning required to teach his methods properly.

Early boxing, circus and self-defense trainer career 
Pilates was originally a gymnast and bodybuilder, but when he moved to England in 1912, he earned a living as a professional boxer, a circus-performer, and a self-defense trainer at police schools and Scotland Yard.

Internment during World War I 
During World War I, the British authorities interned Pilates, along with other German citizens, in Lancaster Castle, where he taught wrestling and self-defense, boasting that his students would emerge stronger than they were before their internment. Pilates studied yoga and the movements of animals and trained his fellow inmates in fitness and exercises. He later said that the intuitive movements of cats, in particular, inspired many aspects of his fitness regime. It was there that he began refining and teaching his minimal-equipment system of mat exercises that later became "Contrology". He was then transferred to another internment camp at Knockaloe on the Isle of Man. During that involuntary break, he began to intensively develop his concept of an integrated, comprehensive system of physical exercise, which he himself called "Contrology". "Contrology" related to encouraging the use of the mind to control muscles, and focusing attention on core postural muscles that help keep the body balanced and provide support for the spine. In particular, Pilates exercises teach awareness of breath and of alignment of the spine, and strengthen the deep torso and abdominal muscles. Some of the early use of Pilates's exercise methods included rehabilitation of seriously injured veterans.

After World War I, Pilates returned to Germany and collaborated with important experts in dance and physical exercise such as Rudolf Laban. In Hamburg, he trained police officers.

Move to the US and marriage 
Around 1925, Pilates immigrated to the United States. On the ship to America, he met his future wife Clara. The couple founded a studio in New York City and directly taught and supervised their students well into the 1960s. 

Joseph and Clara Pilates soon established a devoted following in the local dance and performing-arts community of New York. Well-known dancers such as George Balanchine, who arrived in the United States in 1933, and Martha Graham, who had come to New York in 1923, became devotees and regularly sent their students to the Pilates for training and rehabilitation. His exercise regimen built flexibility, strength and stamina. Soon after it became known that ballerinas were attending the Pilates gym on 8th Avenue, society women followed.

Joseph Pilates wrote several books, including Return to Life through Contrology and Your Health, and he was also a prolific inventor, with over 26 patents cited.

Pilates continued to advocate for and teach his method well into his old age, even once he was physically incapable of performing the exercises himself.

Death 
Pilates died in New York City in 1967 of advanced emphysema at the age of 83.

Books

 Your Health by Joseph H. Pilates (1934)
 Return to Life Through Contrology by Joseph H. Pilates and William J. Miller (1945)
  Reprint of 1945 book
 "The Pilates Pamphlet: Return to Life Through Contrology" by Joseph H. Pilates and Frederick Rand Rogers (1957)

In popular culture 
 Joseph Pilates is the subject of the 2013 documentary film A Movement of Movement made by Mark Pedri.

References

External links 

 English-German blog of Pilates-biographer Eva Rincke in which she shares background information on her research on Joseph Pilates' life.

1883 births
1967 deaths
German emigrants to the United States
People associated with physical culture
People from Mönchengladbach
Sportspeople from New York City
Pilates
World War I civilian prisoners
Deaths from emphysema